Vasily Vasilievich Rudenkov (3 May 1931 – 2 November 1982) was a Soviet athlete who competed mainly in the hammer throw. He was born in Zhlobin, Homel, Belarus.

Rudenkov competed for the USSR in the 1960 Summer Olympics held in Rome, Italy in the hammer throw where he won the gold medal. It was his only Olympics appearance.

He trained at Dynamo in Moscow and was awarded the Order of the Red Banner of Labour (1960)

References 

Sports Reference

1931 births
1982 deaths
Belarusian male hammer throwers
Soviet male hammer throwers
Dynamo sports society athletes
Olympic gold medalists for the Soviet Union
Athletes (track and field) at the 1960 Summer Olympics
Olympic athletes of the Soviet Union
People from Zhlobin District
Medalists at the 1960 Summer Olympics
Olympic gold medalists in athletics (track and field)
Sportspeople from Gomel Region